Hilly Michaels, also known as Hilly Boy Michaels, is an American drummer and musician who is best known for playing drums with  Sparks in the 1970s. Then a New York-based session drummer, he performed on Sparks' 1976 album Big Beat, which was produced by Rupert Holmes. Michaels was the only session musician to go on the North American tour with  Ron and Russell Mael of Sparks. Michaels released two solo albums in the early 1980s, Calling All Girls (1980) and Lumia (1981).

History
His first music experience came with playing in a band called Joy, featuring a young Michael Bolton. Later, Michaels played with artists such as The Cherry Vanilla Band, Peach & Lee, Sparks, Ellen Foley, The Hunter/Ronson Band, Dan Hartman, John Mellencamp, Marianne Faithfull, and Ronnie Wood.

In 1979, Jake Hooker worked with Michaels to capture a million dollar deal with Warner Bros. Records and a music video to promote Calling All Girls in 1980 with Roy Thomas Baker as the producer.

Michaels was in a relationship with Marianne Faithfull during the mid-1980s; they lived together in New York City.

Michaels' songs can be heard in the movies Caddyshack and Die Laughing. In the movie Rollercoaster, he appeared with Sparks, performing the songs "Big Boy" and "Fill'er Up".

He has since worked as a producer and manager of marketing and development. He currently resides in Connecticut, and continues to record.

Discography

Albums
 Calling All Girls (1980)
 Lumia (1981)
 Pop This! (2010)

Singles
 "Calling All Girls" (1980) AUS #99 
 "Shake It and Dance" (1981) AUS #69

References

American drummers
Musicians from New Haven, Connecticut
Sparks (band) members
Living people
Date of birth missing (living people)
Year of birth missing (living people)